Uummannaq Heliport  is a heliport in Uummannaq, a town located on Uummannaq Island in Avannaata municipality in northwestern Greenland. There are no facilities in the heliport.

Airlines and destinations

Air Greenland operates government contract flights to villages in the Uummannaq Fjord region. These mostly cargo flights are not featured in the timetable, although they can be pre-booked. Departure times for these flights as specified during booking are by definition approximate, with the settlement service optimized on the fly depending on local demand for a given day.

Uummannaq 'airport' 

Neighboring Qaarsut Airport, located on Nuussuaq Peninsula on the other side of the Uummannaq fjord is the only daily connection available from Uummannaq, serving Dash-7 aircraft of Air Greenland. It functions as a mini-hub for Uummannaq, marketed as Uummannaq Airport regardless of its actual location, registration, documentation, and existing booking systems.

Photographs

References

 

Airports in the Arctic
Heliports in Greenland
Uummannaq